Vladica Nikolic (born 1 March 1992) is a Serbian rugby league who plays for Villeneuve XIII RLLG in the Elite One Championship He plays as a  or as a .

Career
Nikolic and Villeneuve teammate Milos Calic were both signed from Serbian rugby league club Red Star.

References

External links
Vladica Nikolic - Treize Mondial

1992 births
Living people
Red Star Rugby League players
Rugby league locks
Rugby league props
Rugby league second-rows
Serbia national rugby league team players
Serbian rugby league players
Villeneuve Leopards players